Tatiana Woollaston (born Tatiana Torchilo, alternative spelling Tatiana Tarchyla, 8 November 1986 in Pinsk, Soviet Union) is a professional snooker referee. She is an official referee of the WPBSA, EASB, EBSA and BSF.

Career

Snooker referee
In March 2008 Woollaston started refereeing amateur snooker events in Belarus. She qualified as a Class 3 snooker referee a year later in March 2009 during European Team Snooker Championship in St. Petersburg, Russia, and became a referee member of European Billiards and Snooker Association.
In May 2010 she refereed the European Individual Snooker Championship in Bucharest, Romania.
Woollaston made her ranking tournament debut in August 2010 at European Players Tour Championships event one (Paul Hunter Classic 2010) in Fürth, Germany.

On 21 November 2010 Woollaston became the first referee from Eastern Europe to officiate at a world-ranking snooker semi-final at the Euro Players Tour Championship event six in Prague, the Czech Republic, as John Higgins defeated Joe Jogia by 4 frames to 2.

She worked at following events in 2011:
1. 25–28 August 2011 Paul Hunter Classic/Players Tour Championship – Event 4, Fürth, Germany;
2. 21–25 September Players Tour Championship – Event 5, Sheffield, England;
3. 29–2 October 2011 Warsaw Classic/Players Tour Championship – Event 6, Warsaw, Poland;
4. 5–9 October, Players Tour Championship – Event 7, Gloucester, England. During this event Woollaston qualified as a Class 2 snooker referee. After this tournament Woollaston has officially joined EASB as official referee.

At the 2011 Paul Hunter Classic in Germany, Woollaston made her television debut live on Eurosport. She refereed the match between Ken Doherty and Passakorn Suwannawat. Woollaston will work at all coming Players Tour Championship events in 2011/2012 season.

Personal life

She graduated from Belarus State Economic University, where she studied finance, banking and credit. She received a master's degree in economics. Before moving to the UK, she worked as a teacher at Belarus State Economic University in Minsk.

She married Ben Woollaston, a professional snooker player, in June 2011. Later that year she moved to the UK and now lives with her husband in Leicester, England. Her husband had won the Players Tour Championship event three in Sheffield the day before she moved to the UK. They have two sons, born on 8 November 2012 and 21 October 2017.

References

1986 births
Living people
Sportspeople from Pinsk
Belarusian emigrants to England
Snooker referees and officials
Belarus State Economic University alumni
Women referees and umpires
Academic staff of Belarus State Economic University